The Marcus Garvey People's Political Party (formerly known as the Marcus Garvey People's Progressive Party) is a political party in Jamaica formed by the merger of two minor parties.  The ideology associated with the party is socialist, republican and Pan-Africanist. The party is named after Jamaican National Hero, Marcus Garvey. On election ballots, the party campaign as MG/PPP or simply PPP.

The party is led by Caribbean History teacher, Leon Burrell.

The MGPPP nominated six candidates in the 2016 Jamaican general election.

References

External links

Pan-Africanist political parties in the Caribbean
Political parties in Jamaica
Republicanism in Jamaica
Republican parties
Socialism in Jamaica
Socialist parties in North America